Ingrid Chunyuan Wu or Wu Chunyuan (born 1970 in Changzhou) is a Chinese entrepreneur, business executive and billionaire, who moved to U.S. in 1996 and later received U.S. citizenship. She founded a company called Shenzhen Yuanyu in 1993 with her husband Pan Zhengmin. She acted as chief operational officer of Shenzhen Yuanyu till 2005. This company was followed by AAC Technologies Holdings (in HKEx since 2005).

AAC Technologies manufactures e.g. miniature loudspeakers, receivers and MEMS microphones for Apple and Samsung mobile devices. Company is physically located in Shenzhen, China. Its sales were $2.3 billion in 2016, and the group employed over 52,000 people. Wu owns about 26 percent of the group. In April 2018, based on Bloomberg estimation included 21% of shares owned directly or through a Hong Kong holding company, plus half of the 9% holding of the family. Her shares were worth $5.02 billion.

Wu has been co-founder also in three other companies. Her educational background is nurse (Changzhou School of Public Health, 1989) and she has studied also in Changzhou Party School.

References

Billionaires from Jiangsu
American billionaires
Female billionaires
Living people
1970 births
Businesspeople from Changzhou
Chinese emigrants to the United States
Chinese technology company founders
People with acquired American citizenship
21st-century American businesspeople